This is a list of islands of New Caledonia.

Information
The country of New Caledonia comprises four archipelagos. The following is a breakdown of the islands of the country.

Table of islands

See also

Geography of New Caledonia

 
New Caledonia-related lists